The 12th Saturn Awards, honoring the best in science fiction, fantasy and horror film in 1984, were held on June 9, 1985.

Winners and nominees 
Below is a complete list of nominees and winners. Winners are highlighted in bold.

Film awards

Special awards

George Pal Memorial Award
 Douglas Trumbull

President's Award
 Jack Arnold

References

External links
 The Official Saturn Awards Site
 'Gremlins' Leads Saturn Nominees
 Past Winners Database – 1984 12th Saturn Awards

Saturn Awards ceremonies
Saturn
Saturn